Arne Nygård-Nilssen (5 April 1899 – 26 July 1958) was a Norwegian art historian, publicist and magazine editor.

Biography
Nygård-Nilssen grew up in Bergen, Norway where his father was a school teacher.  He attended the University of Oslo (MS. 1927, PhD. 1945).  At the University he came under the influence of Anders Bugge (1889-1955), a prominent professor of art history. Professor Bugge was  curator at the Norwegian Museum of Decorative Arts and Design in Oslo and served with the Society for the Preservation of Ancient Norwegian Monuments. Nygård-Nilssen subsequently took over Bugge's work with historic Norwegian churches, with a focus on conservation and restoration.

Nygård-Nilssen was secretary of The Society for the Preservation of Ancient Norwegian Monuments from 1929 to 1946.  He replaced Harry Fett as head  the Norwegian Directorate for Cultural Heritage serving from 1946 to 1958.  Arne Nygård-Nilssen also edited the magazine Kunst og Kultur, and a series of scientific books.

He was married to sculptor Maja Refsum. Their daughter Kirsti married Carsten Hopstock.

References

Other sources
Nygård-Nilssen, Arne;   Bugge, Anders; Kielland, Thor; Shetelig, Haakon (eds.) (1945)  Norsk Kunstforskning I Det Tyvende Århundre. Festskrift til Harry Fett   (Cammermeyer Boghandel) 

1899 births
1958 deaths
Writers from Bergen
Norwegian art historians
Directors of government agencies of Norway